Colaconema is a genus of marine red algae. It is the only genus in the family Colaconemataceae  which is the only family in Order	Colaconematales .

The genus has cosmopolitan distribution.

Species

As accepted by AlgaeBase;
 Colaconema americanum C.-C.Jao, 1936
 Colaconema amphiroae (K.M.Drew) P.W.Gabrielson, 2000
 Colaconema asparagopsidis Chemin, 1927
 Colaconema asparagopsis Chemin, 1926
 Colaconema attenuatum (Rosenvinge) R.Nielsen, 1994
 Colaconema basiramosum M.J.Wynne & C.W.Schneider, 2008
 Colaconema bisporum (Børgesen) I.-K.Hwang & H.-S.Kim, 2011
 Colaconema bonnemaisoniae Batters, 1896
 Colaconema caespitosum (J.Agardh) Jackelman, Stegenga & J.J.Bolton, 1991
 Colaconema chylocladiae Batters, 1896
 Colaconema coccinea (K.M.Drew) P.W.Gabrielson, 2004
 Colaconema codicola (Børgesen) H.Stegenga, J.J.Bolton & R.J.Anderson, 1997
 Colaconema codii (G.Hamel) I.-K.Hwang & H.-S.Kim, 2011
 Colaconema comptum (Børgesen) I.-K.Hwang & H.-S.Kim, 2011
 Colaconema conchicola Lami, 1939
 Colaconema dasyae (F.S.Collins) Stegenga, I.Mol, Prud'homme van Reine & Lokhorst, 1997
 Colaconema daviesii (Dillwyn) Stegenga, 1985
 Colaconema desmarestiae (Kylin) P.W.Gabrielson, 2004
 Colaconema dictyotae (Collins) I.-K.Hwang & H.-S.Kim, 2011
 Colaconema elegans (K.M.Drew) I.-K.Hwang & H.-S.Kim, 2011
 Colaconema emergens (Rosenvinge) R.Nielsen, 1994
 Colaconema endophyticum (Batters) J.T.Harper & G.W.Saunders, 2002
 Colaconema erythrophyllum (C.C.Jao) P.W.Gabrielson, 2006
 Colaconema furcatum Tanaka, 1944
 Colaconema garbaryi P.W.Gabrielson, 2004
 Colaconema gracile (Børgesen) Ateweberhan & Prud'homme van Reine, 2005
 Colaconema gymnogongri (K.M.Drew) P.W.Gabrielson, 2004
 Colaconema gynandrum (Rosenvinge) R.Nielsen, 1994
 Colaconema hallandicum (Kylin) , Sansón, Sangil & Díaz-Villa, 2007
 Colaconema hancockii (E.Y.Dawson) J.N.Norris, 2014
 Colaconema hyalosiphoniae (Nakamura) I.-K.Hwang & H.-S.Kim, 2011
 Colaconema hypneae (Børgesen) A.A.Santos & C.W.N.Moura, 2010
 Colaconema infestans (M.A.Howe & Hoyt) Woelkerling, 1973
 Colaconema interpositum (Heydrich) H.Stegenga, J.J.Bolton & R.J.Anderson, 1997
 Colaconema macounii (F.S.Collins) P.W.Gabrielson, 2000
 Colaconema membranacea (Magnus) Woelkerling, 1973
 Colaconema monorhiza H.Stegenga, 1985
 Colaconema naumannii Prud'homme van Reine, R.J.Haroun & L.B.T.Kostermans, 2005
 Colaconema nemalionis (De Notaris ex L.Dufour) Stegenga, 1985
 Colaconema ophioglossum (Schneider) Afonso-Carrillo, Sansón & Sangil, 2003
 Colaconema panduripodium H.Stegenga, J.J.Bolton & R.J.Anderson, 1997
 Colaconema pectinatum (Kylin) J.T.Harper & G.W.Saunders, 2002
 Colaconema proskaueri (J.A.West) P.W.Gabrielson, 2000
 Colaconema punctatum (E.Y.Dawson) J.N.Norris, 2014
 Colaconema rhizoideum (K.M.Drew) P.W.Gabrielson, 2000
 Colaconema sarconemae A.A.Aleem, 1980
 Colaconema scinaiae (E.Y.Dawson) J.N.Norris, 2014
 Colaconema sinicola (E.Y.Dawson) J.N.Norris, 2014
 Colaconema strictum (Rosenvinge) R.Nielsen, 1994
 Colaconema tetrasporum (Garbary & Rueness) Athanasiadis, 1996
 Colaconema thuretii (Bornet) P.W.Gabrielson, 2000
 Colaconema variabile (K.M.Drew) J.N.Norris, 2014

References

Other sources
 Kylin, H. (1956). Die Gattungen der Rhodophyceen. pp. i-xv, 1–673, 458 figs. Lund: C.W.K. Gleerups.

External links

  
 Colaconema at AlgaeBase

Florideophyceae
Red algae genera
Plants described in 1896